Jacqueline Rudet (born 1962) is a British dramatist.

Biography
Born in London, England, Jacqueline Rudet (also known as Magdalene St Luce), spent her early years in the Caribbean island of Dominica, before returning to Britain, and studying drama at Barking College.

Rudet's play Basin opened at the Royal Court Theatre on 29 October 1985. Set in a London flat after a party the night before, the story centring on the friendship between three Dominican women living in London, Basin was published in Black Plays, edited by Yvonne Brewster (Methuen, 1987), and extracts were included in the anthology Daughters of Africa (ed. Margaret Busby, 1992).

Works
 Money to Live. First produced at the Royal Court Theatre, 1984. Published in Plays by Women, Vol. 5, ed. Mary Remnant, Methuen, 1986).
 Basin. Produced at the Royal Court Theatre, 1985.
 God's Second In Command. First produced at the Royal Court Theatre, 1985.
 Take Back What's Yours. First produced at the Warehouse Theatre, Croydon, 1989.

References

External links
 Black Plays Archive: Jaqueline Rudet

1962 births
20th-century British dramatists and playwrights
Living people
Black British women writers
British women dramatists and playwrights